FK Pelikán Děčín was a Czech football club. They were founded in 1921. The club was dissolved in 1998 after finishing second in the 1997–98 season of the Bohemian Football League.

Historical Names
1921–1945         SK Podmokly
1945–1946         I. ČSK Podmokly
1946–1947         SK Poštovní Podmokly
1947–1949         Sociakol Podmokly
1949              Sokol Sociakol Podmokly
1949–1953         Kovostroj Děčín
1953–1957         DSO Baník Děčín
1957–1958         TJ Baník Děčín
1958–1992         TJ Kovostroj Děčín
1992–1993         TJ Kovostroj Pelikán Děčín
1993–1998         FK Pelikán Děčín

League history
Year – Position – Competition – Points
97/98 – 2 – ČFL – 62
96/97 – 4 – ČFL – 56
95/96 – 4 – ČFL – 68
94/95 – 2 – ČFL – 70
93/94 – 1 – Czech Fourth Division Group B – 49
92/93 – 9 – Czech Fourth Division Group B – 25
91/92 – 2 – Czech Fourth Division Group B – 38

Czech Cup appearance
1996/97
 3.Round: FK Pelikán Děčín – FK Teplice = 1:1 i.P.(6:5)
 4.Round: FK Pelikán Děčín – SK Slavia Praha = 0:5

References

 Historická loga a názvy klubů z Děčína (FK Pelikán Děčín)

Football clubs in Czechoslovakia
Association football clubs established in 1921
Association football clubs disestablished in 1998
Defunct football clubs in the Czech Republic
FK Pelikán Děčín